Unpredictable may refer to:

Film and TV
 "Unpredictable" (Eureka), an episode of Eureka

Music

Albums
 Unpredictable (Classified album), 2000
 Unpredictable (Jamie Foxx album), 2005
 Unpredictable (Malik B. album), 2015
 Unpredictable (Mystikal album), 1997
 Unpredictable (Natalie Cole album), 1977

Songs
 "Unpredictable" (Jamie Foxx song), the title song
 "Unpredictable" (Olly Murs and Louisa Johnson song), 2017
 "Unpredictable", a song by Keshia Chanté from Keshia Chanté, 2004
 "Unpredictable", a song by 5 Seconds of Summer from the EP Somewhere New, 2012
 "Unpredictable"(Jackson Yee song), a song by Jackson Yee, 2017

See also
 Predictability